Anthony Jay Robbins (né Mahavoric, born February 29, 1960) is an American author, coach, speaker, and philanthropist. He is known for his infomercials, seminars, and self-help books including the books Unlimited Power and Awaken the Giant Within.

Early life
Robbins was born Anthony J. Mahavoric in North Hollywood, California, on February 29, 1960. Robbins is the eldest of three children, and his parents divorced when he was seven. He is of Croatian descent from both sides of his family. His mother then remarried several times, including a marriage with Jim Robbins, a former semi-professional baseball player who legally adopted Anthony when he was 12.

Robbins attended Glendora High School. During high school, Robbins grew ten inches in a year, a growth spurt later attributed to a pituitary tumor. He has said his home life was "chaotic" and "abusive". When he was 17 years old, he left home and never returned. Robbins later worked as a janitor, and did not attend college. One day he asked the landlord on site, who was a family friend, about how he became so successful. The landlord then told him that he started to turn his life around after going to a Jim Rohn seminar.

Career
Robbins began promoting seminars for motivational speaker and author Jim Rohn when he was 17 years old.  He subsequently learned to firewalk and incorporated it into his seminars.

In 2014, Robbins joined a group of investors to acquire rights to launch a Major League Soccer franchise in Los Angeles referred to as the Los Angeles Football Club. The soccer team entered competition in 2018.

In 2016, Robbins partnered with Golden State Warriors co-owner Peter Guber and Washington Wizards co-owner Ted Leonsis to purchase Team Liquid, an eSports professional gaming organization. 

Robbins has worked on an individual basis with Bill Clinton, Justin Tuck, Hugh Jackman, and Pitbull. He has counseled American businessmen Peter Guber, Steve Wynn, and Marc Benioff.

Robbins was criticized for comments alluding to the Me Too movement at a seminar in San Jose, California, on March 15, 2018, when he said: "If you use the #MeToo movement to try to get significance and certainty by attacking and destroying someone else… all you've done is basically use a drug called significance to make yourself feel good." He went on to tell a story about a "very powerful man" who passed on hiring a female candidate even though she was the most qualified because she was too attractive and would be "too big a risk". He later posted an apology on his Facebook page.

Philanthropy
In 1991, Robbins founded the Anthony Robbins Foundation, intended to help the young, the homeless, the hungry, the elderly, and the imprisoned. Independent charity watchdog Charity Navigator gave the foundation a rating of four out of four stars in 2017.

In 2014, he donated the profits of his book, Money: Master the Game, along with an additional personal donation, through Feeding America to provide meals to people in need.  Robbins works with a water company called Spring Health, which provides fresh water to parts of rural eastern India to prevent waterborne diseases.

Robbins helped raise money for Operation Underground Railroad, a nonprofit organization that works with governments to fight against child trafficking and slavery with the assistance of former CIA, Navy SEALs, and Special operations operatives.

Legal issues and controversies

1995 Consumer redress settlement with Federal Trade Commission
In May 1995, Robbins Research International (RRI) settled with the Federal Trade Commission over alleged violations of the agency's Franchise Rule. Under the settlement, RRI did not admit to having violated any law, but agreed to pay $221,260 in consumer redress.

2000 Wade Cook copyright lawsuit
Wade Cook sued Robbins for allegedly using copyrighted terms from Cook's book Wall Street Money Machine in his seminars. In 2000, a jury awarded Cook a $655,900 judgement, which was appealed. Cook and Robbins settled for an undisclosed amount.

2001 Vancouver Sun defamation lawsuit
In 2001, the British Columbia Supreme Court ruled that The Vancouver Sun had defamed Robbins when it called him an "adulterous, wife-stealing hypocrite". The court awarded Robbins $20,000 in damages and his legal costs.

2012 and 2016 fire-walking injuries
In July 2012, the San Jose Mercury News published a story reporting that several people had been burned and hospitalized during one of Robbins's fire-walking events on July 19, 2012. This story was picked up by other media outlets, including Fox News, The New York Times, and CNN. Aspects of these reports were later challenged by Robbins himself along with some of the on-site medical professionals.

On June 24, 2016, it was reported that "dozens were burned and required medical attention after attempting to walk on hot coals during a fire-walking event at a Tony Robbins seminar in Dallas, Texas". Several attendees were transported to medical facilities to treat burns, and a bus was used as a staging-area for between 30 and 40 people who were less seriously hurt. A spokeswoman for the Robbins organization stated, "Someone unfamiliar with the process of the fire-walk called 911 reporting the need for emergency service vehicles […] there was no need for emergency personnel […] only 5 of 7,000 participants requested an examination beyond what was readily available on site."

2019 sexual harassment and abuse allegations
In May 2019, an investigation by BuzzFeed News detailed accusations against Robbins of his sexual harassment of fans and staff members, such as groping fans at events and exposing his genitals to his assistants.   Robbins denied the allegations and also stated, "I have been the target of a year-long investigation by BuzzFeed. Unfortunately, your organization has made it clear to my team that you intend to move forward with publishing an inaccurate, agenda-driven version of the past, pierced with falsehoods."

In November 2019, BuzzFeed News published a six-part article accusing Robbins of molesting a teenage girl during his time as a "star speaker" at SuperCamp, an elite summer camp in southern California. The article claims the events took place in 1985 when Robbins was 25, and that there were at least two eyewitnesses. Other media outlets also reported on these allegations. Robbins denied wrongdoing and filed suit on BuzzFeed News in Ireland. In response, BuzzFeed News said that they stand by their reporting and suggested that Robbins's decision to file the summons in Ireland was an "abuse" of the Irish court.

Television and film
In July 2010, NBC debuted Breakthrough with Tony Robbins, a reality show that followed Robbins as he helped the show's participants face their personal challenges. NBC canceled the show after airing two of the planned six episodes due to low viewership of 2.8 million. In March 2012, the OWN Network picked up the show for another season beginning with the original first season set to re-run and thereafter leading directly into the new 2012 season. In April 2012, Robbins began cohosting Oprah's Lifeclass on the OWN Network.

In 2015, filmmaker Joe Berlinger directed and produced the documentary Tony Robbins: I Am Not Your Guru, about the Tony Robbins event "Date with Destiny" after filming it in Boca Raton, Florida, in December 2014. It premiered at the South by Southwest film festival in March 2016. The documentary was translated into languages for 190 countries and released by Netflix on July 15, 2016.

Personal life
In 1984, Robbins married Rebecca Jenkins after meeting her at a seminar. Jenkins had three children from two former marriages, whom Robbins adopted. Robbins and Jenkins filed for divorce in 1998.

In 1984, Robbins fathered a child with former girlfriend Liz Acosta. Their son, Jairek Robbins, is also a personal empowerment coach and trainer.

In October 2001, Robbins married Bonnie Humphrey. They live in Manalapan, Florida.

Robbins was a vegan for 12 years, he then added fish to his diet. Whilst eating a fish-heavy diet he developed mercury poisoning and nearly died. His diet now consists of mostly vegetables with a small amount of animal protein.

Select bibliography
 Unlimited Power (1986). Free Press. .
 Awaken the Giant Within (1991). Free Press. .
 Giant Steps (1994). Touchstone. .
 Money: Master the Game (2014). Simon & Schuster. .
 Co-authored with Peter Mallouk (2017). Unshakeable: Your Financial Freedom Playbook. Simon & Schuster. .

References

External links

 
 

1960 births
20th-century American businesspeople
20th-century American male writers
21st-century American businesspeople
21st-century American male writers
21st-century American non-fiction writers
American adoptees
American business writers
American education businesspeople
American finance and investment writers
American financial commentators
American motivational speakers
American motivational writers
American people of Croatian descent
American philanthropists
American self-help writers
Business speakers
Businesspeople from Los Angeles
Life coaches
Living people
Neuro-linguistic programming writers
People from North Hollywood, Los Angeles
Pseudoscientific psychologists
Relationship education
Writers from Los Angeles